The Erastus Corning Tower, also known as the Mayor Erastus Corning 2nd Tower or simply the Corning Tower, is a skyscraper located in downtown Albany, New York. Completed in 1973 and sided with Vermont Pearl marble and glass, the state office building is part of the Empire State Plaza. At 589 feet (180 m) and 44 stories in height, it is the tallest skyscraper in the state of New York outside of New York City. Erastus Corning 2nd, the building's namesake, was the mayor of Albany for over 40 years from 1941 to 1983. The tower was dedicated to him in March 1983 during his hospitalization. Before that dedication, it was known as the "Tower Building".

The Corning Tower houses the New York State Department of Health and the New York State Office of General Services. Two New York State Department of Transportation traffic cameras are located on the building to monitor nearby traffic conditions. From 2000 to 2004, it was the tallest structure in the World Almanac's list of "Other Tall Buildings in North American Cities".

Observation deck
An observation deck is located on the Corning Tower's 42nd floor. It offers expansive views of Albany, the Hudson River, and the surrounding area. Panels below the windows give information about the visible landmarks. The observation deck, however, does not feature a 360-degree view because it has no windows on the west side. A nonstop elevator to the 42nd floor reaches a speed of 26 km/h (16 MPH). The deck is open to the public for free Monday through Friday from 10:00 a.m. to 4:00 p.m. Visitors can access the observation deck via the plaza or concourse levels. Upon taking office in 2010, Governor Andrew Cuomo eliminated a photo ID requirement.

Gallery

Nearby attractions
Empire State Plaza
New York State Capitol Building
New York State Museum
The Egg
Cathedral of the Immaculate Conception

See also
List of tallest buildings in Albany, New York
List of tallest buildings in Upstate New York

References
Notes

Sources
Erastus Corning Tower at Emporis Buildings
Erastus Corning 2nd Biography at AlbanyCounty.com

External links

Corning Tower Observation Deck
NYS DOT Corning Tower East Traffic Camera
NYS DOT Corning Tower North Traffic Camera
3d model
Empire State Plaza
Skyscrapers in Albany, New York
Tourist attractions in Albany, New York
Skyscraper office buildings in New York (state)
Office buildings completed in 1966
Harrison & Abramovitz buildings